Press It is the debut studio album by South Korean singer Taemin. It was released on February 23, 2016, by SM Entertainment. The title song for the album is "Press Your Number".

Background and release
On February 15, 2016, SM Entertainment announced Taemin would release his first full album entitled Press It on February 23. On February 22, a performance video for "Drip Drop" was uploaded to YouTube. The official music video for the album's single, "Press Your Number", came out the next day on February 23. Prior to the album and "Press Your Number" music video release, Taemin performed two showcases for the press and fans on February 22. The fan showcase was streamed live through Naver's V app.

Composition
Press It was produced over the course of a year and a half. The title track, "Press Your Number", was originally written by Bruno Mars, with composition by The Stereotypes. The demo was originally made years prior and was purchased by SM Entertainment. Taemin said that he did not meet with Mars to work on the song. Taemin did, however, pen new lyrics for the song in order to appeal to the Korean market. In addition, another song given to him for this album was "Already", written and composed by his bandmate Jonghyun. While on Jonghyun's Blue Night radio show, Taemin talked about how he took special care in selecting every song on the album himself, even though he didn't write them all. "Soldier" was the first song he had written for an album and it was conceived during his travels abroad. The final song on the album, "Hypnosis", was originally supposed to be included on Taemin's debut EP Ace.

Release and critical reception
Press It reached number one on Gaon Album Chart. On the US Billboard charts, Press It debuted at number two on the World Albums chart and number seven on the Heatseekers chart. On March 1, Taemin received his first music show award for "Press Your Number" on SBS's The Show and during the same week won awards for Show Champion, M! Countdown, and Music Bank.

Track listing

Charts

Weekly charts

Monthly charts

Year-end charts

Accolades

Release history

References

2016 albums
Taemin albums